Truth Be Told is an American legal/crime drama streaming television series on Apple TV+. The series was created by Nichelle Tramble Spellman, based on Kathleen Barber's 2017 debut novel Are You Sleeping. Spellman also acts as executive producer and writes for the show. Unlike the book, Poppy Parnell (Octavia Spencer) plays the main role, as a podcaster who revisits the case that made her famous with the hope of finally getting to the truth.

The series premiered on December 6, 2019. The soundtrack, composed by John Paesano, was released by Lakeshore Records on the same day. New York's Paley Center also aired episodes of the show.

The second season began in August 2021. In December 2021, the series was renewed for a third season, which premiered on January 20, 2023.

Premise
In the first season, San Francisco journalist Poppy Parnell restarts the true crime podcast that made her famous. She hopes to reopen the 1999 murder case of Stanford professor Chuck Buhrman after new evidence suggests Warren Cave, the man she helped put behind bars, was wrongly convicted.

In the second season, Poppy investigates the murder of a photographer/filmmaker at the request of his wife Micah, an equally controversial wellness guru whose friendship with Poppy compromises her judgment.

In the third season, Poppy works with a high school principal to investigate the disappearances of several young black girls in Oakland whose cases lack mainstream media attention. Meanwhile, a mayoral candidate uses white girl Emily Hill's disappearance for his own campaign.

Cast and characters

Main
 Octavia Spencer as Poppy Parnell, an investigative reporter behind a hit true-crime podcast. She uses the last name "Scoville" in Season Three. 
 Aaron Paul as Warren Cave (season 1), a convicted murderer and subject of Poppy's podcasts
 Hunter Doohan as young Warren Cave
 Lizzy Caplan as Josie and Lanie Buhrman (season 1), identical twin sisters whose father was allegedly murdered by Warren Cave
 Elizabeth Perkins as Melanie Cave (season 1), Warren's mother who has been afflicted with lung cancer.
 Michael Beach as Ingram Rhoades, Poppy's husband
 Mekhi Phifer as Markus Killebrew, a former detective and long time friend of Poppy
 Merle Dandridge as Zarina Killebrew, Markus' wife
 Tracie Thoms as Desiree Scoville, Poppy's younger sister
 Haneefah Wood as Cydie Scoville, Poppy's youngest sister
 Ron Cephas Jones as Lukather "Shreve" Scoville, Poppy's father
 Kate Hudson as Micah Keith (season 2), Poppy's childhood friend and famous writer
 David Lyons as Inspector Aames (season 2), the inspector assigned to investigate Micah's husband's death
 Katherine LaNasa as Noa Havilland (season 2; recurring season 1), the producer of Poppy's podcast
 Tami Roman as Lillian "Lily" Scoville (season 2; recurring season 1), Poppy's stepmother
 Rico E. Anderson as Herbie, manages the biker bar, 'The Knock'.

Recurring
 Nic Bishop as Chuck Buhrman (season 1), Josie and Lanie's father
 Annabella Sciorra as Erin Buhrman (season 1), Josie and Lanie's mother
 Molly Hagan as Susan Carver (season 1), Josie and Lanie's aunt
 Billy Miller as Alex Dunn (season 1), Lanie's husband
 Everleigh McDonell as Ella Dunn (season 1), Lanie's daughter
 Brett Cullen as Owen Cave (season 1), Warren's father
 Lyndon Smith as Chandra Willets (season 1)
 Michael Franklin as Young Leander "Shreve" Scoville (season 1)
 Christopher Backus as Holt Redding (season 2), a mysterious man, linked to both Poppy and Micah Keith
 Alona Tal as Ivy Abbott (season 2), Micah Keith's right hand woman
 Mychala Lee as Trini Killebrew (season 2), Markus' daughter

Episodes

Season 1 (2019–20)

Season 2 (2021)

Season 3 (2023)

Production

Development
On January 3, 2018, Apple announced that it was developing a television series based on the novel Are You Sleeping by Kathleen Barber. The show was created by Nichelle Tramble Spellman who also wrote and executive produced the series as well. Other executive producers include Octavia Spencer via her Orit Entertainment, Reese Witherspoon and Lauren Neustadter for their company Hello Sunshine, and Peter Chernin, Jenno Topping and Kristen Campo for Chernin Entertainment. On May 2, 2018, Apple announced that they had given the production a series order for a first season consisting of ten episodes. On June 13, 2018, it was reported that Anna Foerster would direct the series' first episode. A featurette from the series was released on November 26, 2019. On March 5, 2020, Apple renewed the series for a second season, which premiered on August 20, 2021. On December 7, 2021, Apple renewed the series for a third season which premiered on January 20, 2023.

Casting
Simultaneously with reports of the series' development, it was confirmed that Octavia Spencer has been cast in the series' lead role. In June 2018, it was announced that Lizzy Caplan, Aaron Paul, Elizabeth Perkins, Mekhi Phifer, Michael Beach, Tracie Thoms, Haneefah Wood, and Ron Cephas Jones had joined the main cast. Caplan, Paul, and Perkins all reportedly signed one-year deals for the series. In July 2018, it was reported that Tami Roman and Moon Bloodgood had joined the main cast and that Nic Bishop, Annabella Sciorra, Molly Hagan, Billy Miller, Brett Cullen, and Hunter Doohan would appear in recurring roles. In August 2018, it was announced that Lyndon Smith had joined the cast in a recurring capacity. Additionally, it was reported that Bloodgood had dropped out of the role of Cath Min after filming of the first four episodes had been completed. The role was expected to be recast and her already-filmed scenes to be reshot. On October 8, 2018, it was announced that Katherine LaNasa had been cast to replace Bloodgood, and her character Cath Min, in the newly devised recurring role of Noa Havilland. 

In October 2020, it was announced that Kate Hudson would be starring in the second season of Truth Be Told. The next month, it was reported that Merle Dandridge, Jason O’Mara, Alona Tal, David Lyons, Christopher Backus, Cranston Johnson, Hale Appleman, Anthony Lee Medina and Mychala Lee has been cast for the second season of the series. On March 23, 2022, Gabrielle Union was reportedly cast as a lead role in the third season. On April 5, 2022, it was announced that Ana Ayora had joined the cast in the third season.

Filming
Principal photography for the series commenced on June 25, 2018 in Los Angeles, California. Filming reportedly concluded on December 12, 2018. Production for the second season began in Los Angeles on October 26, 2020, after being briefly delayed due to the COVID-19 pandemic. In February 2021, Leimert Park was planned to be a filming location for the second season but was delayed due to protesting against the filming. Filming moved to the Arts District in Los Angeles for the duration of April 2021 and wrapped by the end of the month. It was announced by Apple that third season has begun filming on April 15, 2022.

Reception

Critical response 

On the review aggregator Rotten Tomatoes, the series has a score of 31%, based on 29 reviews, with an average rating of 5.72/10. The site's critical consensus reads, "A twisty thriller that never quite comes together, Truth Be Tolds commitment to the true crime at its center is less interesting or engaging than the family drama orbiting in the periphery." On Metacritic, it has a weighted average score of 46 out of 100, based on 14 critics, indicating "mixed or average reviews".

Awards and nominations

Similar works 

 Murder, She Wrote

References

External links
  – official site
 

2010s American anthology television series
2010s American crime drama television series
2010s American legal television series
English-language television shows
Apple TV+ original programming
2019 American television series debuts
Television shows based on American novels
Television series by Chernin Entertainment
Works by Malcolm Spellman